Punctapinella guamoteana is a species of moth of the family Tortricidae. It is found in Morona-Santiago Province, Ecuador.

The wingspan is 20.5 mm. The ground colour of the forewings is white with pale brownish suffusions and terminal area with rust admixture. The markings are pale brownish with rust parts. The hindwings are whitish, slightly tinged with cream in the apical area.

Etymology
The species name refers to the type locality, between Guamote and Macas.

References

Moths described in 2009
Euliini